Heavy Industries Taxila (Reporting name: HIT), is a Pakistani state-owned defence, military contractor, engineering conglomerate, and military corporation located in Taxila, Punjab, Pakistan.

HIT promotes, markets, engineers, develops, and undertakes heavy engineering works for Pakistan's military and for the civilian law enforcement agencies. It has extensive experience in the overhaul and upgrade of tracked armored fighting vehicles for the Pakistan Armed Forces. 

Leadership in HIT is provided through the appointments made in the GHQ by the chief of army staff who approves the appointment to its chairmanship.

Besides developing the heavy works, HIT also provides military gears for Pakistan's military, building krytron and developing technology involving the solid-state lighting. In 2004, HIT had a work force of about 6000 engineers and highly skilled persons.

Production

Main battle tanks (MBT) 
Al-khalid II (under development)
Al-Khalid I
Al-khalid
Al-Zarrar

Infantry fighting vehicles (IFV) 
 Viper IFV – The prototype IFV was showcased in IDEAS 2018.  The IFV is based on APC Saad/M113 chassis with 6 road wheels, weighs 16 tons, and has appliqué armour.  Viper can accommodate 13 fully equipped troops; and has a modified Turra 30 remotely controlled weapon station (RCWS) armed with a Slovak-made Shipunov 2A42 30 mm automatic cannon, Kalashnikov PKT 7.62 mm medium machine gun (MG), two ready-to-use 9M113 Konkurs (AT-6 'Spandrel') anti-tank guided missiles and smoke dischargers.
 Al-Hamza – IFV based on APC Saad, fitted with 25 mm automatic cannon, an export product not in service with the Pakistan Army.

Armoured personnel carriers (APC) 
 Dragoon II – Armoured multi-role vehicle built with a supervision and support of DUMA Engineering of Belgium.
 APC Saad – Armoured personnel carrier based on the APC Talha design. Modified with extended hull and six road wheels, 14.5 mm machine gun, improved armour protection and a more powerful engine supplied by Germany's MTU. Accommodates 13 fully equipped troops.
 APC Talha – Armoured personnel carrier based on M113 chassis with five road wheels, accommodates 11 fully equipped troops. 250 delivered to the Pakistan Army by 2006. Possibly replaced by the APC Saad.

Reconnaissance vehicles 
 Maaz – Anti-tank/Air defense missile carrier Based on the APC Talha, armed with the Baktar-Shikan anti-tank guided missile (ATGM) launcher and operated by a crew of four. There is capacity for eight extra rounds and the missile firing unit on the roof is retracted into the cabin for reloading. Its Mouz variant is armed with either the Anza or RBS 70 air-defence missile systems. The missile firing unit on the roof is retracted into the cabin for reloading.
 Sakb – Armoured command vehicle based on APC Talha.

Engineering & support vehicles 
 Al-Hadeed – Armoured recovery vehicle based on APC Saad.

Armoured utility vehicles 
 Al-Qaswa – Armoured logistics vehicle based on APC Talha.
 Mohafiz series – Internal security vehicle
 Mohafiz-II – Based on the Land Rover Defender.
 Mohafiz-III (Protector) – Based on the Land Cruiser 79.
 Mohafiz-IV (Interceptor) – Upgraded variant of Mohafiz (vehicle) series based on the Land Cruiser 79.

Weapons 
 125mm Smooth bore tank gun – for Al-Khalid & Al-Zarrar tanks.
 155mm Self propelled (SP) gun – for M109A2 (overhauled) self-propelled howitzer.

Former products
 Type 85-IIAP – Main battle tank produced under license.
 Type 69-IIMP – Main battle tank produced under license.
 M113 – Armoured personnel carrier produced under license. (APC rebuild & overhaul facility is still running).

See also
 Defence Science and Technology Organization
 Pakistan Armed Forces
 Pakistan Ordnance Factories

References

External links 
 

Defence companies of Pakistan
Manufacturing plants in Pakistan
Military research of Pakistan
Technology companies established in 1971
Government-owned companies of Pakistan
Pakistani companies established in 1971